Robert Neville (Angus) Talbot is an Australian lawyer and barrister. He is a retired Judge of the Land and Environment Court of New South Wales and the immediate past Chairman of the Executive Committee of the Council of Newington College.

Early life
Christened Robert Neville, Talbot has always been known by the name Angus. He was educated at Newington College (1949–1953) and graduated in law from the University of Sydney.

Legal career
After practising as a solicitor and partner with Fitzgerald White Talbot & Co from 1960 to 1982, Talbot was admitted to the New South Wales Bar in 1982. He was appointed to the Land and Environment Court of New South Wales bench in 1992 and retired as a Judge in 2007.

Committees
 Vice-President, Environmental Law Association (NSW)
 President, Old Newingtonians' Union (1997–1998) 
 Deputy-Chairman, Newington College Council (2002–2007)
 Chairman, Newington College Council (2007–2013)

References

1936 births
Living people
20th-century Australian judges
People educated at Newington College
Old Newingtonians' Union presidents
Members of Newington College Council
21st-century Australian judges